Croptilon hookerianum, called Hooker's scratchdaisy, is a North American species of flowering plants in the tribe Astereae within the family Asteraceae. It has been found in the US states of Texas, Oklahoma, Kansas, and Arkansas.

Croptilon hookerianum is an herb sometimes reaching a height of 120 cm (4 feet). Flower heads are yellow, with both ray florets and disc florets.

Varieties
 Croptilon hookerianum var. graniticum (E.B.Sm.) E.B.Sm. - Texas
 Croptilon hookerianum var. hookerianum - Texas
 Croptilon hookerianum var. validum (Rydb.) E.B.Sm. - Arkansas, Kansas, Oklahoma, Texas

References

Flora of the United States
Plants described in 1842
Astereae